Tano North is one of the constituencies represented in the Parliament of Ghana. It elects one Member of Parliament (MP) by the first past the post system of election.  Freda Prempeh is a member of parliament for the constituency. She was elected on the ticket of the New Patriotic Party (NPP) won a majority of 5,923 votes to become the MP. She had also represented the constituency in the 4th Republic parliament.

See also
List of Ghana Parliament constituencies

References 

Parliamentary constituencies in Ahafo Region